SCMS Cochin School of Business, formerly School of Communication and Management Studies, is a management institute located at Kochi, India.. The school was established in 1976 by G. P. C. Nayar, under the trust Prathap Foundation for Education and Training. It is part of the SCMS Group of educational institutions. SCMS PGDM is very famous in south India. And it is rated as the best business school in Kerala after IIM-K since many years. The school providing PGDM with electives in Marketing, Finance, Retail, HR, Banking and Insurance and System and Operations. In 2019 batch 26 of PGDM has passed out.		

SCMS is accredited by the Accreditation Council for Business Schools and Programs (ACBSP)  and by the National Board of Accreditation (NBA) since 2003.

Publications
The school publishes a SCOPUS indexed peer-reviewed quarterly journal, the SCMS Journal of Indian Management, focused on economics and business management. Its editor-in-chief is Dr. G.P.C. Nayar, SCMS Group's founder and chairman.

Leadership
The founder and chairman of the SCMS Group is G. P. C. Nayar, an entrepreneur and president of the Federation of Private Self Financing Professional Institutions in India for many years.

References

External links
 

Private schools in Kochi
High schools and secondary schools in Kerala